Cholistan Wildlife Sanctuary is located in Punjab, Pakistan.

Flora and fauna

Wildlife

References

Protected areas of Punjab, Pakistan
Wildlife sanctuaries in Punjab, Pakistan
Wildlife sanctuaries of Pakistan